Ewa Kozanecka (born 29 May 1974) is a Polish politician. She was elected to the Sejm (9th term) representing the constituency of Bydgoszcz.

References

External links 
 

Living people
1974 births
Place of birth missing (living people)
21st-century Polish politicians
21st-century Polish women politicians
Members of the Polish Sejm 2019–2023
Women members of the Sejm of the Republic of Poland
Members of Bydgoszcz City Council